The 1888 United States presidential election in Pennsylvania took place on November 6, 1888, as part of the 1888 United States presidential election. Voters chose 30 representatives, or electors to the Electoral College, who voted for president and vice president.

Pennsylvania voted for the Republican nominee, Benjamin Harrison, over the Democratic nominee, incumbent President Grover Cleveland. Harrison won Pennsylvania by a margin of 7.97%.

Results

Results by county

See also
 List of United States presidential elections in Pennsylvania

References

Pennsylvania
1888
1888 Pennsylvania elections